Central Grove is an unincorporated community in Monroe County, Mississippi. It is located west of Amory and south of Nettleton.

References

Unincorporated communities in Monroe County, Mississippi
Unincorporated communities in Mississippi